Rasul Boqiev (also spelled as Rasul Bokiev; born 29 September 1982) is a Tajikistani judoka who competes in the -73 kg (lightweight) category.  He has won bronze medal at the Judo World Championships and a bronze medal, Tajikistan's first ever Olympic medal, at the 2008 Summer Olympics.

Career 

He is considered one of the top athletes in Tajikistan and the world in the judo under 73 kg weight-class. Since his first international competition at the 2005 Asian Championships Tashkent, where he won the bronze medal, he has been successful in showing results of consistent improvement and athleticism. The following year he also won a bronze medal at the lightweight (73 kg) category of the 2006 Asian Games, winning the bronze medal match against Kim Chol Su of North Korea. In the same year he claimed the 2nd place at the 2006 Otto Super World Cup Hamburg. On 17 February 2007, he won the 2007 World Cup Budapest and on 17 May 2007 he won the bronze medal at the 2007 Asian Championships. His achievement at the 2007 World Judo Championships in Rio de Janeiro earned him his entry to the 2008 Summer Olympics in Beijing. On 9 February 2008, the history repeated itself: for the second time in his career, Rasul competed at the Paris Super World Cup and again finished 7th among 60 competitors.

Rasul also regularly participates in various tournaments in Tajikistan and the countries of the Commonwealth of Independent States. In April 2007 he won the 7th Russian Open Tournament in Chelyabinsk.

On 23 February 2008 Rasul contested at the 2008 Otto Super World Cup and resulted 3rd among 56 competitors. On 7–8 June 2008 Rasul won the 2008 Tre Torri International Judo Tournament in Porto Sant'Elpшdio of Italy.

In August, 2008 Rasul won bronze at the Olympic Games in Beijing. This was Tajikistan's first ever Olympic medal. In the quarter-finals, Rasul beat Si Rijigawa of China to progress to the semi-finals and secure a medal. He was defeated in the semis by the reigning World Champion, Wang Ki-Chun of South Korea.

At the 2012 Summer Olympics, he finished in 7th, losing to Riki Nakaya in the quarter finals, and to Ugo Legrand in the repechage.

External links
Men's Judo under 73kg at the 2008 Summer Olympics
Judo at the Beijing 2008 Summer Olympics
2008 Tre Torri International Judo Tournament Results
2008 Otto Hamburg Super World Cup Results
Paris Super World Cup 2008 Results for Boqiev
2007 World Championships Rio de Janeiro profile
Kuwait City 2007 Asian Judo Championships
2006 Asian Games profile
on alljudo.net
Profile on JudoInside.com
Moscow Judo School of Rasul Boqiev

References

External links

1982 births
Living people
Tajikistani male judoka
People from Districts of Republican Subordination
Olympic judoka of Tajikistan
Judoka at the 2008 Summer Olympics
Judoka at the 2012 Summer Olympics
Olympic bronze medalists for Tajikistan
Olympic medalists in judo
Asian Games medalists in judo
Medalists at the 2008 Summer Olympics
Judoka at the 2006 Asian Games
Judoka at the 2010 Asian Games
Asian Games bronze medalists for Tajikistan
Medalists at the 2006 Asian Games
Medalists at the 2010 Asian Games
21st-century Tajikistani people
20th-century Tajikistani people